Thomas Purcell, Baron of Loughmoe (1538 – c. 1607) was an Irish nobleman.

Biography

Purcell was a member of the wealthy Purcell family, at the time a family of great import in the area. He was a Catholic.

Purcell, with his family and followers, were among the forces that fought against Desmond troops in Kerry in 1599.

On the last day of the Second Desmond Rebellion, Purcell escaped from the fighting, ending his career in warfare.

Cumha Bharúin Loch Mór
Thomas' greatest legacy is most likely a 1599 harp composition he commissioned to be played at his funeral, titled . The lament was probably commissioned by Purcell for his impending death.

Purcell had written his last will in March 1597, John Scott composed his lament in 1599, and the Baron eventually died on 3 August 1607.

Notes

References

Bibliography

External links 
Staff notation of Cumha Bharúin Loch Mór / Scott's Lamentation

1538 births
1609 deaths
People from County Tipperary
16th-century Irish people
17th-century Irish people
People of Elizabethan Ireland